The Embassy of the Federal Republic of Germany in Moscow is the chief diplomatic mission of Germany in the Russian Federation. It is located at 56 Mosfilmovskaya Street in the Ramenki District of Moscow.

See also 
 Germany–Russia relations
 Embassy of Germany in Saint Petersburg
 Diplomatic missions in Russia
 List of ambassadors of Germany to Russia

References

External links 
  Embassy of Germany in Moscow

Germany–Russia relations
Germany
Moscow